Khargana is a rural locality (an ulus) in Selenginsky District, Republic of Buryatia, Russia. The population was 950 as of 2010. There are 42 streets.

Geography 
Khargana is located 36 km northeast of Gusinoozyorsk (the district's administrative centre) by road. Nizhny Ubukun is the nearest rural locality.

References 

Rural localities in Selenginsky District